Edward Wadding Plunkett, 14th Baron Dunsany (7 April 1773 – 11 December 1848) was an Anglo-Irish peer.

He was the son of Randall Plunkett, 13th Baron of Dunsany, and Margaret Mandeville, and he inherited his father's title of Baron of Dunsany on 4 April 1821. Between 1835 and his death he was Lord Lieutenant of Meath. On 18 January 1836, he was elected as an Irish representative peer and took his seat in the House of Lords as a Conservative.

On 20 June 1803, he married Hon. Charlotte Louisa Lawless, a daughter of Nicholas Lawless, 1st Baron Cloncurry. They had two sons (both of whom would succeed to their father's title in turn) and one daughter. After his first wife's death in 1818, he married secondly Hon. Eliza Kinnaird, a daughter of George Kinnaird, 7th Lord Kinnaird, on 26 March 1823.

References

1773 births
1848 deaths
19th-century Anglo-Irish people
Conservative Party (UK) hereditary peers
Lord-Lieutenants of Meath
Barons of Dunsany